Neville Godwin (born 31 January 1975) is a former tennis player from South Africa.

Godwin turned professional in 1994. The right-hander won one singles title (2001 Newport) in his career, and reached his highest individual ranking on the ATP Tour in March 1997, when he became World No. 90.

His highest world ranking for doubles was World No. 57.

At the 1996 Wimbledon tournament, Godwin had his best finish at a Grand Slam, when he reached the fourth round as a qualifier, defeating Cristiano Caratti, compatriot Grant Stafford and Boris Becker before losing to Alex Rădulescu.

He finished his career in 2003.

He now lives in his hometown of Johannesburg with his wife, Nicky and two sons, Oliver and James. He coached performance players out of the Wanderers Club for 5 years, before coaching South African player Kevin Anderson to a world top 10 ranking and a US Open final appearance in 2017. In 2017, he won ATP Coach of the Year award. On 12 November 2017 it was announced Godwin and Anderson had split. He came into limelight again during the Australian Open 2018 when Hyeon Chung, who was being coached by Godwin became the first player from South Korea to reach the semifinals of a grand slam.

Junior Grand Slam finals

Doubles: 3 (1 title, 2 runner-ups)

ATP career finals

Singles: 2 (1 title, 1 runner-up)

Doubles: 3 (3 runner-ups)

ATP Challenger and ITF Futures finals

Singles: 9 (2–7)

Doubles: 18 (11–7)

Performance timelines

Singles

Doubles

External links
 
 
 
 Neville Godwin at the Association of Tennis Professionals Coach profile

1975 births
Living people
South African male tennis players
Tennis players from Johannesburg
South African people of British descent
US Open (tennis) junior champions
White South African people
South African tennis coaches
Grand Slam (tennis) champions in boys' doubles